Talesh Mahalleh may refer to various places in Iran:

Gilan Province
 Talesh Mahalleh, Langarud, Gilan Province
 Talesh Mahalleh, Rasht, Gilan Province
 Talesh Mahalleh, Shaft, Gilan Province
 Talesh Mahalleh, Sowme'eh Sara, Gilan Province

Mazandaran Province
 Talesh Mahalleh, Juybar, Mazandaran Province
 Talesh Mahalleh-ye Fatuk, Ramsar County, Mazandaran Province
 Talesh Mahalleh, Tonekabon, Mazandaran Province